Strika may refer to
Strika (Transformers), a character from the Transformers: Beast Wars franchise
Raleigh Strika, a children's bicycle manufactured between 1976 and 1983 in England
Roko Strika (born 1994), Australian association football midfielder